Stomphastis aphrocyma is a moth of the family Gracillariidae. It is known from South Africa and Zimbabwe.

The larvae feed on Croton sylvaticus. They mine the leaves of their host plant. The mine has the form of a moderate, irregular, oblong to semi-circular, transparent blotch mine which starts as a very short gallery.

References

Stomphastis
Lepidoptera of Zimbabwe
Lepidoptera of South Africa
Moths of Sub-Saharan Africa